Benares brass is the brassware from the city of Benares (also known as Varanasi, Varenisi or Kashi) in Uttar Pradesh, India. The city is located in an area naturally rich in copper - a requisite ingredient of brass.

Benares is a pilgrimage site as it is considered home to the God Shiva or Visweswara. Many devotees from local and foreign lands travel to this city to worship Lord Shiva. As a result, manufacturing of brass utensils, artifacts, antiques and puja (devotional) articles has become a business in Benares.

With the use of technology and modern machines, the time taken to prepare these artifacts has decreased. Being a holy site, majority of the articles are small oil lamps, tridents, masks of Gods and Goddesses etc. in any combination of embossed, engraved, enameled or burnished brass vessels and brass items.

In ancient India, brass oil lamps decorated with Sanskrit inscriptions, Hindu icons, women, and swans, were in early usage in Hindu temples, and households. Guilds were established in the various trades overseen by Karkhanadars; similar to the journeyman and apprentice of trades of European trades and artisans. Karkhanadars were required to train within the caste, or be subject to being outcasts themselves. The apprentice would need to develop his work for 6 years before achieving full wage and becoming a Karkhandadar. A school has been established in Benares to teach brassware and inevitably the timeless practices of the guilds are being replaced, to keep pace with modern societal demands.

Benares brass is also used in making bangles, which is considered a symbol of feminine grace and ethnicity.

References

External links
Benares (Nuttall Encyclopædia)
brasses, ornamental - HighBeam Encyclopedia
Learn about Indian Art
Copper Glossary 

Brass
Copper alloys
Culture of Varanasi
Economy of Varanasi